Dr. Kasaraneni Sadasivarao (1923-2012) was an Indian surgeon and politician. He hailed from Takkelapadu in Guntur district of Andhra Pradesh.

Career

After the death of his wife, he retired from public life and lived in his family home in Guntur. In memory of his spouse, he started the "Dr. Jayapradamba Degree College" in Guntur, which aims to provide education at an affordable price for youngsters.  He was also the founding secretary of Nagarjuna Educational Society and served as its President for a number of years which expanded under his tenure.

He was a elected to Legislative Assembly of Andhra Pradesh from Pedakurapadu constituency in 1985. He was a member of Telugu Desam Party. Although Rao was a notable surgeon, he had a limited political career.

Death
He died at his home on 11 September 2012.

References 

20th-century Indian educational theorists
Telugu Desam Party politicians
Indian surgeons
2012 deaths
1923 births
People from Guntur district
Telugu politicians
Andhra Pradesh politicians
20th-century Indian medical doctors
Medical doctors from Andhra Pradesh
20th-century surgeons
20th-century Indian philanthropists